A transducer is a device that converts energy from one form to another. Usually a transducer converts a signal in one form of energy to a signal in another.
Transducers are often employed at the boundaries of automation, measurement, and control systems, where electrical signals are converted to and from other physical quantities (energy, force, torque, light, motion, position, etc.). The process of converting one form of energy to another is known as transduction.

Types

 Mechanical transducers, so-called as they convert physical quantities into mechanical outputs or vice versa;
 Electrical transducers however convert physical quantities into electrical outputs or signals. Examples of these are:
 a thermocouple that changes temperature differences into a small voltage;
 a linear variable differential transformer (LVDT), used to measure displacement (position) changes by means of electrical signals.

Sensors, actuators and transceivers
Transducers can be categorized by which direction information passes through them:
 A sensor is a transducer that receives and responds to a signal or stimulus from a physical system. It produces a signal, which represents information about the system, which is used by some type of telemetry, information or control system. 
 An actuator is a device that is responsible for moving or controlling a mechanism or system. It is controlled by a signal from a control system or manual control.  It is operated by a source of energy, which can be mechanical force, electrical current, hydraulic fluid pressure, or pneumatic pressure, and converts that energy into motion. An actuator is the mechanism by which a control system acts upon an environment. The control system can be simple (a fixed mechanical or electrical system), software-based (e.g. a printer driver, robot control system), a human, or any other input.
 Bidirectional transducers (can) convert physical phenomena to electrical signals and also convert electrical signals into physical phenomena. An example of an inherently bidirectional transducer is an antenna, which can convert radio waves (electromagnetic waves) into an electrical signal to be processed by a radio receiver, or translate an electrical signal from a transmitter into radio waves.  Another example are voice coils, which are used in loudspeakers to translate an electrical audio signal into sound, and in dynamic microphones to translate sound waves into an audio signal.
 Transceivers integrate simultaneous bidirectional functionality. The most ubiquitous example are likely radio transceivers (in aircraft called transponders), used in virtually every form of wireless (tele-)communications and network device connections. Another example are ultrasound transceivers that are used for instance in medical ultrasound (echo) scans.

Active vs passive transducers
Passive transducers require an external power source to operate, which is called an excitation signal. The signal is modulated by the sensor to produce an output signal. For example, a thermistor does not generate any electrical signal, but by passing an electric current through it, its resistance can be measured by detecting variations in the current or voltage across the thermistor.

Active transducers in contrast, generate electric current in response to an external stimulus which serves as the output signal without the need of an additional energy source. Such examples are a photodiode, and a piezoelectric sensor, photovoltic, thermocouple.

Characteristics
Some specifications that are used to rate transducers:
Dynamic range: This is the ratio between the largest amplitude signal and the smallest amplitude signal the transducer can effectively translate. Transducers with larger dynamic range are more "sensitive" and precise.
Repeatability: This is the ability of the transducer to produce an identical output when stimulated by the same input. 
Noise: All transducers add some random noise to their output. In electrical transducers this may be electrical noise due to thermal motion of charges in circuits.  Noise corrupts small signals more than large ones.
Hysteresis: This is a property in which the output of the transducer depends not only on its current input but its past input. For example, an actuator which uses a gear train may have some backlash, which means that if the direction of motion of the actuator reverses, there will be a dead zone before the output of the actuator reverses, caused by play between the gear teeth.

Applications

Electromagnetic
Antennae – converts propagating electromagnetic waves to and from conducted electrical signals
magnetic cartridges – converts relative physical motion to and from electrical signals
Tape head, disk read-and-write heads – converts magnetic fields on a magnetic medium to and from electrical signals
Hall effect sensors – converts a magnetic field level into an electrical signal
Pickup (music technology) – movement of metal strings induces an electrical signal (AC voltage)

Electrochemical
pH probes
Electro-galvanic oxygen sensors
Hydrogen sensors

Electromechanical
Electromechanical input feeds meters and sensors, while electromechanical output devices are generically called actuators):
Accelerometers
Air flow sensors
Electroactive polymers
Rotary motors, linear motors
Galvanometers
Linear variable differential transformers or rotary variably differential transformers
Load cells – converts force to mV/V electrical signal using strain gauges
Microelectromechanical systems
Potentiometers (when used for measuring position)
Pressure sensors
String potentiometers
Tactile sensors
Vibration powered generators
Vibrating structure gyroscopes

Electroacoustic
Loudspeakers, earphones – converts electrical signals into sound (amplified signal → magnetic field → motion → air pressure)
Microphones – converts sound into an electrical signal (air pressure → motion of conductor/coil → magnetic field → electrical signal)
Tactile transducers – converts electrical signal into vibration ( electrical signal → vibration)
Piezoelectric crystals – converts deformations of solid-state crystals (vibrations) to and from electrical signals
Geophones – converts a ground movement (displacement) into voltage (vibrations → motion of conductor/coil → magnetic field → signal)
Gramophone pickups – (air pressure → motion → magnetic field → electrical signal)
Hydrophones – converts changes in water pressure into an electrical signal
Sonar transponders (water pressure → motion of conductor/coil → magnetic field → electrical signal)
Ultrasonic transceivers, transmitting ultrasound (transduced from electricity) as well as receiving it after sound reflection from target objects, availing for imaging of those objects

Electro-optical 
Also known as photoelectric:
Fluorescent lamps – converts electrical power into incoherent light
Incandescent lamps – converts electrical power into incoherent light
Light-emitting diodes – converts electrical power into incoherent light
Laser diodes – converts electrical power into coherent light
Photodiodes, photoresistors, phototransistors, photomultipliers – converts changing light levels into electrical signals
Photodetector or photoresistor or light dependent resistor (LDR) – converts changes in light levels into changes in electrical resistance
Cathode-ray tubes (CRT) – converts electrical signals into visual signals

Electrostatic
Electrometers

Thermoelectric
Resistance temperature detectors (RTD) – converts temperature into an electrical resistance signal
Thermocouples – converts relative temperatures of metallic junctions to electrical voltage
Thermistors (includes PTC resistor and NTC resistor)

Radioacoustic
Geiger-Müller tubes – converts incident ionizing radiation to an electrical impulse signal
Radio receivers converts electromagnetic transmissions to electrical signals.
Radio transmitters converts electrical signals to electromagnetic transmissions.

See also
 Cybernetics
 Horn analyzer
 List of sensors
 Tactile sensor

References

External links

Introduction to Closed Loop Hall Effect Current Transducers
Federal Standard 1037C, August 7, 1996: transducer
A sound transducer with a flat flexible diaphragm working with bending waves